Paddy Richmond (born 1980) is an Irish hurler who played as a left corner-back for the Antrim senior team.

Richmond made his first appearance for the team during the 2002 National League and was a regular member of the starting fifteen until his retirement after the 2009 championship. During that time he won one Christy Ring Cup winners' medal, seven Ulster winners' medals and a National League (Division 2) winners' medal.

At club level Richmond is a seven-time Ulster medalist with Dunloy. In addition to this he has also won eight county championship winners' medals.

References

1980 births
Living people
Dunloy hurlers
Antrim inter-county hurlers
Ulster inter-provincial hurlers